Charumathi Ramachandran (born 12 July 1951) is a Carnatic music singer.

She is a disciple of M.L. Vasanthakumari. She was a gold medalist and stood first in music from the Madras University. She was one of the first carnatic vocalists to introduce Hindustani forms in her music.

She is married to Trichur V. Ramachandran, who is also a Carnatic vocalist.

References

External links
Profiles of Artistes, Composers, Musicologists

Women Carnatic singers
Carnatic singers
Singers from Chennai
1951 births
Living people
Indian women classical singers
20th-century Indian singers
20th-century Indian women singers
Women musicians from Tamil Nadu
Recipients of the Sangeet Natak Akademi Award